documenta 12 was the twelfth edition of documenta, a quinquennial contemporary art exhibition. It was held between 16 June and 23 September 2007 in Kassel, Germany. The artistic director was Roger M. Buergel in collaboration with Ruth Noack.

Documenta 12 magazines was one of the central projects of the documenta exhibition. It was conceived and directed by Georg Schöllhammer.

Participants

References 

Documenta
2007 in Germany
2007 in art